A number of politicians, public figures, media outlets, businesses and other organisations endorsed voting either in favour or against same-sex marriage during the Australian Marriage Law Postal Survey.

"Yes" campaign

Lead lobby groups 
 Australian Marriage Equality – The leading lobby group for same-sex marriage in Australia, running under the banner of the Equality Campaign, announced at a press conference on 11 August that, if the legal challenge to the survey is unsuccessful, "we have a duty to every Aussie who supports fairness and equality to try to win it. We are in this to win this".
 GetUp! – The left-leaning activist group announced it would "engage in a campaign to win a Yes result...to deliver...the fairer and more equal country we believe in".

Notable individuals

Notable bands

Politicians

Federal

State and territory

Local

International

Organisations and agencies

Sports groups and organisations

Newspapers and websites

State and local governments

Religious groups 
Religious groups who advocate a "yes" vote include:
 Australian Council of Hindu Clergy
 Buddhism Australia
 Pitt Street Uniting Church
 Quakers Australia
 Rabbinic Council of the Union for Progressive Judaism
 St Michael's Uniting Church, Melbourne

Denomination leaders who advocate a "yes" vote include:
 Frank Brennan, Catholic priest
 Kay Goldsworthy, the Anglican Archbishop of Perth

Prior to the postal survey, over 500 Australian faith leaders signed a joint letter asking the Australian Government to enact same-sex marriage. Leaders signing were Anglican, Catholic, Uniting Church, Hindu, Buddhist, Jewish and Muslim.

Political parties

Others 
 Fitzy and Wippa, radio show
 Kath and Kim, television comedy
 Kinky Boots Australia, musical
 RuPaul's Drag Race, US reality competition series
 Wicked Australia & NZ, musical
 Will & Grace, US sitcom

Rallies 

Some of the "largest LGBTI demonstrations in Australian history" occurred in the lead-up to the postal survey in various cities. On 27 August, approximately 20,000 people attended a rally in Melbourne calling on the government to legalise same-sex marriage, whilst on 10 September more than 30,000 people gathered in Sydney's CBD supporting a "Yes" vote in the survey.

"No" campaign

Lead lobby groups 
 Australian Catholic Bishops' Conference  (ACBC) has said, "Vote No, to keep marriage as a unique relationship between a woman and a man . . . the consequences of changing marriage are very real".
 Coalition for Marriage, a body formed by several groups opposed to same-sex marriage to co-ordinate a "No" campaign.
 Australian Christian Lobby (ACL) advocates a "No" vote, in-part, because of the perceived implications for children.
 Marriage Alliance states that it wants to respect same-sex attracted people but does not want to change the current definition of marriage.
 FamilyVoice Australia which advocates Voting No for freedom and for children.

Notable individuals 

 John Anderson, former Deputy Prime Minister and leader of the National Party of Australia (1999–2005)
 Bronwyn Bishop, former MP for Mackellar
 Joe Bullock, former Labor Senator for Western Australia
 Roger Corbett, former CEO of Woolworths Limited and former chairman of Fairfax Media
 Miranda Devine, Conservative columnist
 David Flint, legal academic
 Israel Folau, rugby union player

 John Howard, former Prime Minister of Australia (1996–2007)
 Barnaby Joyce, former Deputy Prime Minister of Australia and Leader of the National Party
 Mark Latham, former Leader of the Labor Party
 Bill O'Chee, former Senator National for Queensland
 Lyle Shelton, managing director of the Australian Christian Lobby
 Warren Truss, former Deputy Prime Minister and leader of the National Party of Australia (2013–2016)
 Karina Okotel, federal vice president of the Liberal Party.

Politicians

Organisations and agencies 
 Antipodean Resistance, Neo-Nazi and fascist group
 United Patriots Front, far-right nationalist anti-Islam organisation

Religious groups

Political parties

Neutral

Organisations and agencies 
 Australia and New Zealand Banking Group (ANZ)
 Australian Broadcasting Corporation (ABC)
 Australia Post
 Deloitte Access Economics
 Holden
 Optus
 REA Group
 The Salvation Army

Sports groups and organisations 
 Australian Olympic Committee
 Carlton Football Club
 Fremantle Football Club
 Hawthorn Football Club
 Swimming Australia
 West Coast Eagles

State and local governments 
 City of Brisbane

Political parties 
 Jacqui Lambie Network
 Liberal Party of Australia
 Pauline Hanson's One Nation

References 

2017 in Australia
2017 in LGBT history
Same-sex marriage in Australia